FanDuel Group is an American gambling company that offers sportsbook, daily fantasy sports, horse racing, and online casino. The company operates sportsbooks in a number of states including New Jersey, Pennsylvania, Indiana and West Virginia, as well as an online horse race betting platform, and a daily fantasy sports service.

The company was originally founded as a daily fantasy sports provider, and principally competed with DraftKings. In May 2018, amid the widening legalization of sports betting in the United States, FanDuel agreed to merge with the U.S. operations of Irish bookmaker Paddy Power Betfair (now Flutter Entertainment) to form FanDuel Group. The acquisition sought to leverage the company's existing brand recognition and user base, with FanDuel becoming the company's main U.S. brand.

History
FanDuel was founded by Nigel Eccles, Lesley Eccles, Tom Griffiths, Rob Jones and Chris Stafford on July 21, 2009 in Edinburgh, Scotland, as a pivot from Hubdub, a news prediction site, after taking in $1.2 million in venture capital funding from Pentech Ventures and Scottish Enterprise. In 2010, FanDuel held its first "FanDuel Fantasy Football Championship (FFFC)." The event consisted of ten users who won entry into the event by winning a qualifying league throughout the NFL season. First place was awarded $25,000 and the total prize pool was $40,000.

On January 30, 2013, FanDuel announced that it had closed an $11 million Series C funding round. In September 2014, the company announced $70 million in Series D funding. In July 2015, FanDuel announced a Series E funding round of $275 million leading the company to be valued at over a billion dollars.

In May 2015, FanDuel hired 38 of 42 employees that were laid off by Zynga 365 sports. Shortly after announcing the Series E fundraise, FanDuel acquired sports analytics company numberFire. Then in July 2015 FanDuel made its second acquisition in app developer Kotikan. Kotikan developed FanDuel's mobile app, and it was decided that they would be brought in house to help further develop mobile offerings. In September 2015, FanDuel acquired the esports focused DFS service AlphaDraft.

In October 2015, The New York Times reported that an employee of DraftKings inadvertently released data before the start of the third week of NFL games and won $350,000 on the FanDuel website. DraftKings stated that the employees could not have used their information to make decisions about FanDuel lineups. FanDuel and DraftKings have since prohibited their employees from playing in contests for money on rival websites. At the time of the incident the company released a statement that DraftKings' employees had won up to 0.3% of the $2 billion of prize money that FanDuel has given out. In a separate analysis it was shown that 91% of the player profits at DraftKings and FanDuel were won by just 1.3% of players on the website.

On November 18, 2016, DraftKings and FanDuel announced an intent to merge. The combined company would serve over five million users. On June 19, 2017, the Federal Trade Commission (FTC) announced that it would seek a preliminary injunction to block the then proposed merger. The FTC stated that the proposed transaction would give the combined company 90% of the DFS market, which it considered to be a monopoly position. The merger was subsequently terminated.

In September 2017, FanDuel and DraftKings each paid $1.3 million to settle with the Massachusetts Attorney General's office over allegations of unfair and deceptive practices by the companies prior to 2016. In November 2017, Nigel Eccles left the company. He was replaced as CEO by Matt King, who was previously CFO. Co founder Tom Griffiths left the company shortly thereafter, replaced by Nik Bonaddio, formerly of NumberFire, as Head of Product.

Acquisition by Paddy Power Betfair, expansion to sports betting 
In May 2018, Ireland-based bookmaker Paddy Power Betfair announced its intent to acquire FanDuel. Paddy Power Betfair planned to contribute $158 million and merge its existing assets in the United States (which also include the horse racing oriented cable networks TVG Network and TVG2) into FanDuel; Paddy Power Betfair holds a 61% controlling stake, with the option to increase its stake to 80% and 100% over time.

The merger came in the wake of the Professional and Amateur Sports Protection Act of 1992 — which effectively outlawed sports betting in almost all states in the United States — being declared unconstitutional by the Supreme Court. FanDuel had been preparing to offer a sports wagering platform, while Paddy Power Betfair stated that the merger would make it "exceptionally well placed to target the prospective sport betting opportunity." FanDuel will serve as Paddy Power Betfair's primary operating brand in the United States.

The merger was completed on July 11, 2018, with the combined company of FanDuel and Paddy Power Betfair's US operations becoming known as FanDuel Group. The FanDuel board valued FanDuel's stake in the merger at $465 million, which was significantly lower than FanDuel's internal valuation and resulted in a $120 million lawsuit in Scottish court by the company founders including Lesley Eccles, the former head of marketing for FanDuel. Subsequently in February 25, 2020 over 100 former employees, company founders and early investors filed suit in New York against FanDuel's board for breach of fiduciary duty in allegedly undervaluing FanDuel to enrich themselves.

A few days after the merger was completed, FanDuel opened its first branded sportsbook at the Meadowlands Racetrack in New Jersey. In March 2019, a FanDuel sportsbook opened at Valley Forge Casino Resort in Pennsylvania. FanDuel also offers online sports betting in Indiana, New Jersey, Illinois, Pennsylvania, West Virginia, and New York.

In August 2018, FanDuel announced that it had partnered with Minute Media to create The Duel, a new site for fantasy/sports betting information generated by fans.

In 2019, Paddy Power Betfair, now known as Flutter Entertainment, acquired Canadian gaming operator The Stars Group. As part of the sale, Fox Corporation (which took a minority stake in The Stars Group as part of a joint venture to offer Fox Sports-branded sports betting services) has the option to acquire 18.5% of FanDuel Group in July 2021.

In February 2020, FanDuel reached an agreement with Scientific Games to serve as the technology partner for its current and future sports betting operations. In December 2020, Flutter Entertainment announced that it had increased its stake in FanDuel Group to 95% in a $4.1 billion cash-and-stock deal. In May 2021, FanDuel announced that CEO Matt King would be stepping down after four years with the company.

Partnerships
In November 2018, FanDuel announced a multi-year agreement to become a sports betting partner, and official daily fantasy sports partner, of the National Hockey League. The company announced a separate team sponsorship with the NHL's New Jersey Devils the same day, which includes in-arena sponsorship for FanDuel Sportsbook, and brand integration via team platforms.

Awards and recognition

2021 
 EGR North America Virtual Awards: Operator of the Year

2016 
 Webby Awards: Judges Selection: Best Sports App (Handheld Device)

2015
 Webby Awards: Judges Selection: Best Sports App (Handheld Device)
 Webby Awards: People's Choice Award: Best Mobile Sports App
 Inc Magazine: Best Industries
 Fantasy Sports Trade Association (FSTA) Best Daily Fantasy Sports Contest, Best Daily Fantasy Mobile App and Best Fantasy Live Event.

2014 
 FSTA's Best Daily Fantasy Product for both Web and Mobile

2013 
 FSTA's Best Fantasy Contest
 Nominated for the Europas Best Gaming or Social Games Start Up 2013
 Mashable Sports Innovation Index Winner 2012

2012 
 Mashable's Sports Innovation Index & FSTA Most Outstanding Fantasy Contest

2010 
 Techcrunch Best Sports and Entertainment Award
 Heraldscotland.com Global Ambition Award
 TechCrunch's Best Sports and Entertainment Startup

References

External links
 

Browser-based game websites
Bookmakers
Fantasy sports websites
Daily fantasy sports
Internet properties established in 2009
2009 establishments in New York City
2018 mergers and acquisitions
Sports betting